St Michael's Church is in the Coppenhall area of Crewe, Cheshire, England.  The church is recorded in the National Heritage List for England as a designated Grade II listed building.  It is an active Anglican parish church in the diocese of Chester, the archdeaconry of Macclesfield and the deanery of Nantwich.

History

A timber-framed church was built on the site around 1373.  The structure of the present church dates from 1883 to 1886 when the chancel was built to a design by James Brooks. The nave was added to a design by J. Brooks, Son and Adkins in 1907–10.

Architecture

Exterior
The church is built in red brick with slate roofs. Its plan consists of a four-bay nave with a clerestory, north and south aisles, transepts and a chancel with an organ to its north and a chapel to its south. Over the crossing is a copper-covered flèche. The church is built on a blue brick plinth and has a stone cill band and stone lancet windows.

Interior
To the west of the church is the baptistery which contains a marble font with an oak crocketted cover. The reredos is painted in the style of an icon.  The pulpit is of oak. On the walls are alabaster memorials and timber Stations of the Cross. The three-manual organ was built around 1900 by Forster and Andrews, and rebuilt in 1977 with alterations, by Sixsmith. The organ was rebuilt in 2017, again by Sixsmith, taking the opportunity to remove any asbestos in the structure.

External features
The churchyard contains the double war grave of the twin Villiers-Russell brothers, Senior Sick Berth Attendants of the Royal Navy Auxiliary Reserve, who died in the torpedoing of HMS Formidable during World War I, in 1915.

See also

Listed buildings in Crewe

References

19th-century Church of England church buildings
Churches completed in 1910
Church of England church buildings in Cheshire
Grade II listed churches in Cheshire
Diocese of Chester